Pseudaletis dolieri is a butterfly in the family Lycaenidae. It is found in Cameroon and the Central African Republic.

References

Butterflies described in 2007
Pseudaletis